Mi Gao Huang Chen was a British Chinese man who was attacked on 23 April 2005 by a large group of youths outside the Chinese takeaway he ran in Scholes, Wigan, Greater Manchester. He died of his injuries on 28 April at the age of 41. The police arrested 23 people in connection with the attack, four of whom were eventually convicted of murder.

Background 

Born in China, Chen moved to the UK several years before his death.
In 2004 he and his girlfriend, Jia Ming Yah, who was known as Eileen Jia, bought the Superb Hut takeaway after the previous owner had abandoned it because of the harassment they suffered. In the months before the attack, the couple reported  several incidents of antisocial behaviour to the police, including racial abuse and attacks on 22April that smashed a window; Jia later said the police response to these incidents was lacking.

Murder 

On the night of the attack, Chen, Jia, and their chef, wielding weapons, confronted a group of youths who had gathered outside the takeaway, chasing them onto a nearby housing estate. At some point, a teenage girl was allegedly assaulted. The trio retreated, and Huang Chen was attacked by the youths, who by then had obtained their own weapons. During the attack—which lasted 15 minutes, was captured on camera, and was described by the prosecution as "forceful, deliberate and plain to see"—Chen was punched, kicked, had his head stamped on, and was attacked with the weapons. The coverage shows a girl throwing a branch at Jia, and Jia's attempts to protect Chen. Huang Chen fell into a coma, and was taken to Hope Hospital (now Salford Royal), where he died on 28 April. The pathologist who examined the body found that it had a fractured skull, a broken jaw, and a partly crushed brain; and said the cause of death was trauma to the head.

Aftermath 

The death contributed to the development of a number of schemes and groups designed to address crime in the local area. Hsiao-Hung of The Guardian said the attack was part of a trend of increasing anti-Chinese violence in the country. Jia and some in the Chinese community saw the attack as racially motivated, saying that the youths were white. Bobby Chan, chairperson of Min Quan, and Suresh Grover, director of The Monitoring Group, said the police had a tendency to fail to support Chinese victims such as Jia: "it seemed that most criminal justice agencies froze when it came applying the most basic of the Lawrence Inquiry recommendations to Chinese victims". Detective chief inspector Steve Crimins of Greater Manchester Police said the attack was not racially motivated, and that "[t]o say that any failure to deal with previous incidents led directly to the death of Mr Chen is ludicrous". The Institute of Race Relations considers the death to have a "(known or suspected) racial element". In May 2011 Sankey had his sentence reduced to eight years and six months.

References

Sources 
 . Monitoring Group and University of Hull. pp. 3–5. Accessed 18 August 2011. 20 August 2011.

Anti-Chinese sentiment
Deaths by beating in the United Kingdom
Deaths by person in England
Chinese community in the United Kingdom
History of Wigan
Murder in Greater Manchester
2000s in Greater Manchester
2005 murders in the United Kingdom
2005 in England